Bob Lonsberry (born July 18, 1959) is an American radio talk show host, columnist, author and conservative.

He has been a newspaper reporter, columnist, photojournalist and editor, as well as a magazine writer and commentator on radio and television and a television reporter and manager. He is the author of The Early Years, a collection of newspaper columns, as well as a collection of essays, and four short novels.

Lonsberry is a native of Canisteo, New York.

Radio shows 
Once using the promotional tagline "The most fired man in Rochester media,"  Lonsberry hosts two radio talk shows featuring a mix of news, political commentary, callers, and day-to-day anecdotes. One show airs on WHAM (AM) in Rochester, New York from 8 AM to 12 PM ET. The other airs on WSYR (AM) in Syracuse, New York from 3 PM to 6 PM.

Lonsberry almost always expresses a conservative opinion about the issues he discusses on his talk shows. Typically, he spends most of his shows discussing local and state issues—less frequently discussing national issues. He also discusses life and family issues. Lonsberry is married to his third wife. He and his first wife divorced, and his second marriage was annulled.

When Lonsberry is absent, progressive talk radio host George Kilpatrick has occasionally filled in for him, a situation that brought Kilpatrick a certain degree of hate mail.

Merchandising 
In February 2009, Lonsberry coined the term "FUBO" and began selling T-shirts and other merchandise with the term at fubowear.com. This term, an acronym for the phrase "F-ck U Barack Obama", is often used on his radio show to express disgust with the actions and policies of the US President. He also promotes NOBO (NO Barack Obama) apparel and accessories.

Controversy, firing, rehiring, and latest firing 
While Lonsberry was working as a talk show host for WHAM-Rochester in late 2003, an orangutan had temporarily escaped its cage in Rochester's Seneca Park Zoo.  Lonsberry made the comment while monkey sounds played, "a monkey's loose up at the zoo again--and he's running for county executive." He was insinuating that Mayor Johnson was unfit for the position.  The two candidates were Maggie A. Brooks, a white woman who was then county clerk, and William A. Johnson, Jr., a black man who was then mayor. Lonsberry never mentioned the three-term mayor by name.  WHAM radio said in a statement that "although Mr. Lonsberry expressed a willingness to change, it became obvious to us that he is not embracing diversity."

Lonsberry was later fired from WHAM-AM for the remarks (but not from KNRS, both Clear Channel radio stations). When WHAM ratings in his time slot plunged, he was rehired following completion of sensitivity training. During his absence, many fans of his Rochester show boycotted the station and its sponsors until he was returned to the airwaves.

On June 16, 2010, Lonsberry was fired from KNRS in Salt Lake City, Utah, where he had hosted show weekdays between 5 AM to 9 AM MT for a decade. In his daily web column, he indicated that the station attributed his firing to his lower listener ratings following the introduction of the Portable People Meter. Lonsberry also suggested that his opposition to Republican primary candidate for US Senate, Mike Lee, a Utah-based attorney whose employer, a law firm whose clients includes one of KNRS's advertisers, might have been a factor in his firing. Lonsberry writes:

Of course, being suspicious is my stock-in-trade, and the timing of my termination and the stand I’ve been taking on the looming senatorial primary and the fact I’ve been opposing a candidate who made $600,000 from one of our largest advertisers last year, does make me wonder. Strings get pulled in the real world, and politics is hardball, and our program’s effort helped tip the nominating convention, so it’s not impossible that I lost my job in Salt Lake so that somebody else could get a job in Washington.

Lonsberry vocally supported Mike Lee's primary-election opponent, Tim Bridgewater, a businessman and former Chairman of the Utah County Republican Party. The Bridgewater Campaign subsequently pulled all its ads from radio station KNRS.

Interest in Lonsberry's firing from KNRS was high, with over a thousand reader comments—several times the normal response—to Lonsberry's weekday blog. Fans also started a grassroots listener campaign with the objective of restoring Lonsberry to his position (bringbobbacktoutah.com). Lonsberry returned to the Utah airwaves in February 2011 on radio station KLO 1430AM.

On December 20, 2011, Lonsberry announced that he was doing his last morning broadcast on KLO due to an upcoming schedule change at WHAM. He no longer broadcasts in the Utah radio market.

While the content of Lonsberry's Rochester and Salt Lake City shows were politically and socially conservative, his approach in two broadcast markets differed due to local content and interests. The former Salt Lake City show was more genteel and included frequent religious references whereas the Rochester show is more raucous and occasionally risqué. (On the WHAM show, Lonsberry frequently mentions his affinity for women's breasts.) He broadcasts his Rochester show from the WHAM studio, although he occasionally originates the program from his home.

In November 2019, Lonsberry was ridiculed online after comparing the word “boomer” to the N-word. The phrase "OK boomer" had been used on the video sharing app TikTok by Generation Z and millennials to show their hatred toward baby boomers. Dictionary.com chimed in on the controversy, noting that "Boomer is an informal noun referring to a person born during a baby boom, especially one born in the U.S. between 1946 and 1965" and "The n-word is one of the most offensive words in the English language."

In April 2022, he was fact-checked after starting a debunked rumor on social media that a school district was putting litter boxes in bathrooms for students who identify as cats, sometimes known as "furries".

Author 
Lonsberry is a former columnist for the Rochester Times-Union. He currently writes a weekday column published on his own website. He has also been published in The Washington Times and on the National Rifle Association's website, nra.com.

Lonsberry has authored five books:
A Various Language
Baghdad Christmas
Hopiland Christmas
Santa Monica Christmas.
A Joseph Avenue Christmas

Religion 
Lonsberry was a missionary for the Church of Jesus Christ of Latter-day Saints (LDS Church) on the Navajo and Hopi reservations in the American Southwest. He was excommunicated from the church for bad conduct some time before 2001. Although less frequently than on KNRS, he continues to discuss religious topics on his WHAM show and still considers himself an adherent of Mormonism. He has written in defense of the veracity of the Book of Mormon and of Mormonism's place in broader Christianity. Lonsberry avoids publicly discussing his former membership status in the LDS Church but has often discussed topics related to the church during his radio shows. These religious discussions were frequent on the former Salt Lake City show but are discussed much less often with the Rochester and Syracuse area audiences. As of 2019, Lonsberry's Twitter bio states that he has since reconciled with and rejoined the LDS Church.

References 

 Talk show webpage for WHAM
 Talk show webpage for KNRS

External links 
 Web column
 Personal biography

Latter Day Saints from New York (state)
American radio personalities
American television talk show hosts
American male writers
Living people
1959 births

People excommunicated by the Church of Jesus Christ of Latter-day Saints
People from Canisteo, New York
American Mormon missionaries in the United States